People Get Ready is the debut studio album by American garage rock band The Mooney Suzuki. Recorded at Sweatbox Studio in Austin, Texas, it was released on September 5, 2000, by Estrus Records. The album was later reissued by Estrus in July 2011.

Recording and production
People Get Ready was recorded by Tim Kerr with engineer Mike Vasquez at Sweatbox Studio in Austin, Texas. The band worked with Kerr on the recommendation of Dave Crider, then-head of Estrus Records, who suggested they "just let the tapes roll and see what happens". The album was mastered at Golden Mastering in Ventura, California.

Promotion and release
Following the album's release in September 2000, The Mooney Suzuki embarked on a nationwide tour which lasted over six months; the band claim to have completed "three consecutive laps around the US, often performing two shows a day in each city". The album was later reissued as an LP record by Estrus on July 12, 2011.

Critical reception
Media response to People Get Ready was generally positive. AllMusic writer Jeremy Salmon awarded the album four out of five stars, praising the band's "retro" sound which he compares to that of MC5 and The Stooges. Describing the style of the album as "garagey, proto-punk rock", Salmon concluded that People Get Ready "is an album that ... still can make one excited that music like this is still extant in the world".

Track listing

Personnel

The Mooney Suzuki
Sammy James, Jr. – vocals, guitar
Graham Tyler – guitar, vocals
John Paul Ribas – bass, vocals
Will Rockwell-Scott – drums

Additional personnel
Mike Vasquez – engineering
Tim Kerr – recording
Art Chantry – design
Jessica Arp – photography

References

2000 albums
The Mooney Suzuki albums